Mail Order Bride is a 1964 American Western comedy film directed by Burt Kennedy and starring Buddy Ebsen, Keir Dullea and Lois Nettleton. The screenplay concerns an old man who pressures the wild son of a dead friend into marrying a mail-order bride in an attempt to settle him down.

Plot
Retired lawman Will Lane promises to look after a dying friend's son. He is given the deed to the man's Montana ranch and instructed not to let the friend's son, Lee Carey, have it until Lee gives up his immature ways.

One provision is that Lee must marry. Will uses a catalog to look for a suitable wife. He ends up finding Annie Boley, a widow in Kansas City with a six-year-old son, working in a saloon for Hanna, who originally placed the ad in the catalog.

Lee agrees to marry her, with ranch hand Jace as his best man, but assures Annie that their marriage will be in name only, with no other marital obligations. Will learns that Jace has been stealing cattle. Lee refuses to believe it until Jace proposes they rustle together and leave the ranch in ruins.

When Jace starts a fire with the boy still inside the house, Lee rescues him and comes to his senses. An angry Will believes Lee conspired with Jace to steal the herd and disgustedly gives him the deed. But Lee realizes he cares for his new family and asks Will to help him get back the cattle. They corner Jace in town and in a shootout Jace is killed.

Lee vows to rebuild the ranch and Will rides back to Kansas City to court Hanna.

Cast
 Buddy Ebsen as Will Lane
 Keir Dullea as Lee Carey
 Lois Nettleton as Annie Boley
 Warren Oates as Jace
 BarBara Luna as Marietta (as Barbara Luna)
 Paul Fix as Sheriff Jess Linley
 Marie Windsor as Hanna
 Denver Pyle as Preacher Pope
 William Smith as Lank
 Kathleen Freeman as Sister Sue
 Abigail Shelton as Young Old Maid
 James Mathers as Matt Boley
 Doodles Weaver as Charlie Mary
 Diane Sayer as Lily Fontaine
 Ted Ryan as Bartender

See also
 List of American films of 1964

References

External links
 
 
 

1963 films
1963 comedy films
1960s Western (genre) comedy films
American Western (genre) comedy films
Films about weddings
Films directed by Burt Kennedy
Films set in Kansas City, Missouri
Films set in Montana
Metro-Goldwyn-Mayer films
1960s English-language films
1960s American films